"Toi et Moi" is Namie Amuro's 13th single under the Avex Trax label, released on July 7, 1999.

Overview
"Toi et moi" is French for You and Me. The song was used as the ending theme to the Japanese version of the second Pokémon movie, Revelation Lugia. Although she had already experimented with urban music in the past, this single is considered as her first real attempt at it. Despite that, this is her first single to have a more urban sound, and her step-away from dance-pop to urban-pop.

Charts 
"Toi et Moi" debuted at  3 with 121,970 copies sold in its first week, selling 272,110 copies in total.
It charted for 11 weeks. Toi et Moi was the 85th best-selling single of 1999. It was certified gold for 200,000 copies shipped.

Track listing 
 Toi et MoiStraight Run (4:17)
 Toi et MoiA&S NY Bounce Remix (5:17)
 Toi et MoiTV Mix (4:15)

Production 
 Producer – Tetsuya Komuro
 Additional Production – Anthony ACID & DJ Scribble
 Arrangement – Tetsuya Komuro
 Writers – MARC & TK
 Mixing – Eddie Delena
 Remixing – Anthony ACID & DJ Scribble

References 

1999 singles
Namie Amuro songs
Songs written by Tetsuya Komuro
1999 songs
Avex Trax singles
Japanese film songs
Songs from Pokémon